In the women's singles at the 1997 Budapest Lotto Open tennis tournament, Ruxandra Dragomir was the defending champion but lost in the second round to Joannette Kruger.

Second-seeded Amanda Coetzer won in the final 6–1, 6–3 against Sabine Appelmans.

Seeds
A champion seed is indicated in bold text while text in italics indicates the round in which that seed was eliminated.

  Karina Habšudová (semifinals)
  Amanda Coetzer (champion)
  Ruxandra Dragomir (second round)
  Sabine Appelmans (final)
  Åsa Carlsson (first round)
  Katarína Studeníková (first round)
  Henrieta Nagyová (semifinals)
  Alexandra Fusai (quarterfinals)

Draw

External links
 1997 Budapest Lotto Open draw

Budapest Grand Prix
1997 WTA Tour